Abigail Spears and Juan Sebastián Cabal were the defending champions, but lost in the quarterfinals to Tímea Babos and Rohan Bopanna.

Gabriela Dabrowski and Mate Pavić won the mixed doubles tennis title at the 2018 Australian Open, defeating Babos and Bopanna in the final, 2–6, 6–4, [11–9].

Seeds

Draw

Finals

Top half

Bottom half

References

External links
 Main Draw
 2018 Australian Open – Doubles draws and results at the International Tennis Federation

Mixed Doubles
Australian Open - Mixed Doubles
Australian Open - Mixed Doubles
Australian Open (tennis) by year – Mixed doubles